In modal logic, the window operator  is a modal operator with the following semantic definition:

Informally, it says that w "sees" every φ-world (or every φ-world is seen by w). This operator is not definable in the basic modal logic (i.e. some propositional non-modal language together with a single primitive "necessity" (universal) operator, often denoted by '', or its existential dual, often denoted by ''). Notice that its truth condition is the converse of the truth condition for the standard "necessity" operator.

For references to some of its applications, see the References section.

References 

Logic
Modal logic